Eurindicus bhugarbha is a species of subterranean shrimp in the family Euryrhynchidae, known from a single location in Kerala. It is the only member of its family found in Asia. The species is related to Troglindicus phreaticus, found in the Ratnagiri caves of Maharashtra.

References 

Crustaceans described in 2022
Palaemonoidea
Crustaceans of Asia